Conceição do Castelo is a municipality in central Espírito Santo, Brazil. Its population was 12,806 (2020) and its area is 369 km².

History
The municipality was created when it separated from Castelo on 7 May 1964.

Location
Conceição do Castelo is about 120 km from the state capital Vitória. It stands in the mountainous region of the state, roughly southwest of the capital.

Economy
The economy is largely based on agriculture. Some important products are coffee, beans, maize, tomatoes and pigs, as well as cattle.

References

Municipalities in Espírito Santo